is a Japanese professional boxer who held the WBO mini-flyweight title from 2021 to 2023.

As of June 2022, he is ranked as the world's fourth best mini-flyweight by BoxRec, The Ring and TBRB.

Professional career

Early career

Career beginnings 
Taniguchi made his professional debut against Thawi Chaisat on April 3, 2016, and won the fight by a first-round knockout. He amassed an 8-1 record over the next 15 months, achieving six of those victories by stoppage.

Taniguchi challenged the reigning OPBF mini-flyweight titlist Tsubasa Koura on November 11, 2017. He lost the fight by majority decision. Two judges scored the fight for Koura as 115-114 and 115-113, while the third judge scored it as a 114-114 draw.

Following his failed OPBF title bid, Taniguchi faced Patiphan Prajuabsook on December 31, 2017. He won the fight by a third-round technical knockout.
Taniguchi was next scheduled to face Reymark Taday on February 8, 2018, and won the fight by a sixth-round technical decision. Taniguchi fought Joel Lino for the vacant WBO Asia Pacific mini-flyweight title on November 13, 2018. He won the fight by unanimous decision. Two judges scored eleven of the twelve rounds for Taniguchi, while the third judge scored it 116-112 for him.

These three victories earned Taniguchi the change to challenge the reigning WBO mini-flyweight champion Vic Saludar, in the latter's first title defense, on February 26, 2019. Saludar won the fight by unanimous decision, with two judges scoring the fight 117-111 in his favor, while the third judge awarded him a 118-110 scorecard.

Taniguchi was scheduled to face the undefeated prospect Kai Ishizawa on September 21, 2019. He won the eight-round bout by unanimous decision, with scores of 77-74, 77-74 and 78-74.

Japanese mini-flyweight champion
Taniguchi was scheduled to fight Hizuki Saso for the vacant Japanese mini-flyweight title on December 3, 2020. He won the fight by a tenth-round technical knockout, and was awarded all nine prior rounds by two of the three judges, while the third scored eight of the nine rounds for Taniguchi. Taniguchi made his first Japanese mini-flyweight title defense against Tatsuro Nakashima on June 7, 2021. He dominated the bout, winning all four rounds prior to the fifth-round technical knockout of Nakashima.

WBO mini-flyweight champion

Taniguchi vs. Méndez
On October 7, 2021, the WBO ordered Wilfredo Méndez to make his third mini-flyweight title defense against the mandatory challenger Masataka Taniguchi. On October 27, 2021, a successful purse bid was held, which had a minimum bid of $40,000. The bout would take place on December 14, 2021, at the Ryōgoku Kokugikan in Tokyo, Japan. Taniguchi won the fight by an eleventh-round technical knockout. He first knocked Méndez down with a left straight in the second round, which put him in an early point lead, which was made greater after Méndez was deducted a point in the sixth round for excessive holding. Taniguchi upped his output in the eleventh round, forcing referee Nobuto Ikehara to stop the fight with a flurry of punches to which the cornered Méndez did not respond.

Taniguchi vs. Ishizawa
Taniguchi was booked to make his first WBO mini-flyweight title defense against Kai Ishizawa on April 22, 2022, in the main event of PBX Phoenix Battle 87, which was broadcast as a pay per view by Abema TV. The bout was a rematch of their September 21, 2019 meeting, which Taniguchi won by unanimous decision. It took place at the Korakuen Hall in Tokyo, Japan. Although Taniguchi weighed in at 47.6 kg, 0.2 below the championship limit, Ishizawa came in 2.5 kg above the limit. Ishizawa failed to make weight in his second attempt as well, as he weighed in at 49.9 kg. Ishizawa was allowed to compete after making 49.9 kg on the day of the fight, although he was ineligible to win the title. Taniguchi retained the belt by an eleventh-round technical knockout, forcing a referee stoppage with a flurry of punches at the 2:29 minute mark of the penultimate round. He was leading on the scorecards at the time of the stoppage, with all three judges having scored the fight 99–91 in his favor.

Taniguchi vs. Jerusalem
Taniguchi is scheduled to make his second WBO championship defense against the one-time WBC mini-flyweight title challenger Melvin Jerusalem. The bout was scheduled as the main event of "3150 FIGHT vol.4" and took place at the Osaka Prefectural Gymnasium in Osaka, Japan on January 6, 2023. It was broadcast by Abema TV. Taniguchi lost the fight by a second-round technical knockout. He was dropped with a one-two combination near the beginning of the round and remained unsteady on his feet despite beating the ten-count, which prompted referee Roberto Ramirez Jr. to wave the bout off.

Professional boxing record

See also
List of world mini-flyweight boxing champions
List of Japanese boxing world champions

References

1994 births
Living people
Sportspeople from Kobe
Japanese male boxers
Mini-flyweight boxers
World mini-flyweight boxing champions
World Boxing Organization champions

External links